Brachodes mesopotamica is a moth of the family Brachodidae. It is found in Turkey and Iraq.

References

Moths described in 1949
Brachodidae